Center Township is an inactive township in Ralls County, in the U.S. state of Missouri.

Center Township is at the geographical center of Ralls County, hence the name.

References

Townships in Missouri
Townships in Ralls County, Missouri